Billy Joel – The Hits is a greatest hits album by American singer-songwriter Billy Joel, released on November 16, 2010, in the United States only. It is the first single disc compilation released in the States. It leaves off some major classics such as "Just the Way You Are", "She's Always a Woman" and "Uptown Girl", in favor of lesser known tracks, such as "Everybody Loves You Now".

Track listing

Certifications

References 

2010 greatest hits albums
Billy Joel compilation albums